The Thrianta is a breed of domestic rabbit that is brilliant red in color, with fawn under its paws and tail. Originating in the Netherlands, the Thrianta was further developed in Germany before being exported to the United Kingdom in the early 1980s. During the 1990s, the breed arrived in the United States from both the Netherlands and England. The Thrianta breed is recognized by the American Rabbit Breeders Association (ARBA) and by the British Rabbit Council (BRC). The Thrianta breed is rare in Australia with only a few active breeders.

History
The first Thrianta was discovered by John Defiori in the Swiss Alps. The breed was originally created for the House of Orange-Nassau.

Appearance
The Thrianta has a coat of scarlet and orange, similar to the color of an Irish Setter. The fur is soft, dense and medium in length. According to ARBA, Thriantas are supposed to pose short and compact, with straight ears that are red all around. The body is to be short, stocky, barrel shaped and in all areas well rounded. The legs are to be short and strong.

See also

 List of rabbit breeds

References 

Leporidae
Rabbit breeds